Clambus ceylonicus, is a species of fringe-winged beetle endemic to Sri Lanka.

Description
This comparatively large species has a body length is about 1.0 to 1.1 mm. Body reddish brown or reddish yellow. Dorsal surface covered with long erect setae. Both metasternum and femoral plates covered with long leaning setae. Pronotum convex. Elytra very convex, with evenly rounded lateral margins. Elytral apex is sharp, and almost rectangular. Elytral surface is shiny at elytral disc and clothed with few yellowish long erect setae. Ventrum shiny, with long, leaning setae. In male, the aedeagus is long and broad, with lanceolate apex. Parameres are long, with bifid apex.

References 

Scirtoidea
Insects of Sri Lanka
Beetles described in 1978